Wuri is a metro station on the Green line of Taichung Metro. Although the station has the same name as Wuri railway station, the stations are not connected and are approximately 300 meters apart.

References 

Taichung Metro